JISC may refer to:

 Jisc, formerly known as Joint Information Systems Committee, the UK body concerned with information and communications technology in education
 Japanese Industrial Standards Committee